Ischnocampa is a genus of moths in the family Erebidae.

Species

 Ischnocampa achrosis Dognin, 1912
 Ischnocampa affinis Rothschild, 1935
 Ischnocampa albiceps Dognin, 1911
 Ischnocampa angulosa Gaede, 1928
 Ischnocampa birchelli Druce, 1901
 Ischnocampa brunneitincta Rothschild, 1909
 Ischnocampa celer Schaus, 1892
 Ischnocampa discopuncta Hampson, 1901
 Ischnocampa ferrea Dognin, 1914
 Ischnocampa floccosa Rothschild, 1909
 Ischnocampa griseola Rothschild, 1909
 Ischnocampa hemihyala Hampson, 1909
 Ischnocampa huigra Schaus, 1933
 Ischnocampa ignava Dognin, 1912
 Ischnocampa insitivum Draudt, 1917
 Ischnocampa lithosioides Rothschild, 1912
 Ischnocampa lugubris Schaus, 1892
 Ischnocampa mamona Dognin, 1892
 Ischnocampa mundator Druce, 1884
 Ischnocampa nubilosa Dognin, 1892
 Ischnocampa obscurata Hampson, 1901
 Ischnocampa perirrotata Hampson, 1901
 Ischnocampa pseudomathani Gaede, 1928
 Ischnocampa remissa Dognin, 1902
 Ischnocampa rubrosignata Reich., 1936
 Ischnocampa sordida Felder, 1874
 Ischnocampa sordidior Rothschild, 1909
 Ischnocampa styx E. D. Jones, 1914
 Ischnocampa tolimensis Rothschild, 1916
 Ischnocampa tristis Schaus, 1889

References

 
Phaegopterina
Moth genera